North One is a production company based in London and Birmingham, England. It was originally known as Chrysalis Television and is now part of All3Media.

North One won a tender for a programme to accompany Channel 4's Formula 1 coverage from 2016.

References

External links
North One official website

Television production companies of the United Kingdom
Television in London
Mass media in Birmingham, West Midlands
All3Media